is a station of Tokyo Sakura Tram.

Lines
Gakushuinshita Station is served by Tokyo Sakura Tram.

Railway stations in Tokyo